Sebkhet el Kourzia is a  Intermittent lake in Tunisia near Jebel Zebes and Koudiat er Roha.

References

Lakes of Tunisia